is the 17th single by Japanese music trio Candies. Written by Takemi Shima and Yūsuke Hoguchi, the single was released on March 1, 1977. This was the first single to feature Miki Fujimura on lead vocals.

The song peaked at No. 3 on Oricon's singles chart and sold over 392,000 copies.

Track listing 
All lyrics are written by Takemi Shima; all music is composed and arranged by Yūsuke Hoguchi.

Chart positions

References

External links 
 

1977 singles
1977 songs
Japanese-language songs
Candies (group) songs
Sony Music Entertainment Japan singles